The 1895 West Dorset by-election was held on 14 May 1895 after the death of the incumbent Conservative MP Henry Richard Farquharson. The seat was retained by the Conservative candidate Robert Williams.

Notes and references
Notes 
  
References

By-elections to the Parliament of the United Kingdom in Dorset constituencies
May 1895 events
1895 elections in the United Kingdom
1895 in England
19th century in Dorset